Dolomedes gertschi is a species of nursery web spider in the family Pisauridae. It is found in the United States.

Taxonomy 
Dolomedes gertschi is closely related to the Dolomedes scriptus. This is bases on similarities of both their colour patterns and the tibial apophyses of the males. The species differ from each other by their palpi

Range 
In the first description of the species in 1973, it was only said to exist in the mesic parts
of the Gila River drainage in Arizona and New Mexico. Current recorded observations in GBIF suggests that this still is the case.

References

External links

 

Dolomedes
Articles created by Qbugbot
Spiders described in 1973